Mark Nichols, ONL (born January 1, 1980) is a Canadian curler from St. John's, Newfoundland and Labrador. He currently plays third for the Brad Gushue rink. Nichols is a former Olympic champion curler, having played third for Team Canada at the 2006 Winter Olympics, where the team won a gold medal. He also won a World Championship with Gushue in 2017.

Career
Nichols was born in Labrador City, Newfoundland, the son of Gerry and Helen Nichols. Nichols began curling at the age of 3 in Labrador City.  In 1995, he played for Newfoundland at the Canada Games, placing eighth.

Between 1999 and 2011, Nichols lived in St. John's, Newfoundland and Labrador, where he played third for the Brad Gushue rink. It was with Gushue that he represented Canada at the 2006 Winter Olympics. With Gushue, Nichols has been to three Canadian Junior Curling Championships (1999, 2000, and winning in 2001) and fourteen Briers (2003-2005, 2007-2011, 2015–2020). He also qualified for the 2013 and 2014 Brier with Manitoba's Jeff Stoughton rink. He also won the World Junior Curling Championships in 2001 with Gushue. He also won Gold in the 2006 Winter Olympic Games in Turin, at which he threw a spectacular shot - running back a guard onto another stone which picked another rock that was sitting in a dead zone - in the 6th end of the final against Finland, helping Canada to score 6. Certainly, one thing to aid their victory was the fact that Nichols shot a blistering 97 percent in the gold medal final. "When he’s playing that way, we don’t lose very much," said Gushue. He is also the 2017 Tim Hortons Brier Champion, again as third for Gushue, defeating Kevin Koe 7-6 in the final, helping Gushue to win the Brier in his 14th appearance. This was an especially sweet victory for Nichols, who had lost 3 Brier finals previously- with Gushue to Glenn Howard in 2007, with Stoughton to Brad Jacobs in 2013, with Gushue to Kevin Koe in 2016. The 2017 Brier was also in St. John's, where the Gushue team is from. The team went undefeated at the 2017 World Men's Curling Championship, defeating Niklas Edin in the final. At the 2018 Brier, he went back-to-back as brier champion, but this time he was a member of Team Canada, defeating Brendan Bottcher of Alberta 6-4 with fellow skip Brad Gushue. At the 2018 World Men's Curling Championship, they would lose the final in a rematch against Sweden's Edin. They couldn't win three Briers in a row, losing the 3 vs. 4 game of the 2019 Tim Hortons Brier to Brendan Bottcher.

Nichols has won a career total of twelve Grand Slam of Curling events, ten with Gushue and two with Stoughton. He won his first at the 2010 The National (January), defeating Randy Ferbey in the final. He also won the National in 2013 and 2015. He won two Masters (2014, 2017), two Canadian Open's (2014, 2017), two Elite 10's (2016, 2018 (Sept.)) and one Tour Challenge, Players' Championship and Champions Cup.

He briefly retired from curling after the 2011 Brier, although he always suggested he might return at some point, which he did for the 2012-2013 season as Jeff Stoughton's lead.  He would play two whole seasons with Jeff, winning a silver at the 2013 Brier, and in the middle of the 2013-2014 season, moved to throwing second stones for Jeff, missing the playoffs at the Canadian Olympic Trials, but winning a bronze at the 2014 Brier.  He left the Stoughton rink to reunite with Brad after the 2014 Brier.

He won the Ford Hot Shots shot-making competition at the 2005 Brier, winning a two-year lease on a new Ford vehicle.

Nichols also skipped team Newfoundland and Labrador with sister Shelley, Brent Hamilton and Jennifer Guzzwell to a Canadian Mixed Curling Championship in 2005.

2022 Winter Olympics
Nichol's team, skipped by Brad Gushue, qualified as the Canadian representatives for the 2022 Winter Olympics by winning the 2021 Canadian Olympic Curling Trials, defeating Brad Jacobs 4–3 in the final. The team would go onto win the bronze medal.

Personal life
In 2005, he graduated with a Bachelor's degree in Kinesiology from the Memorial University of Newfoundland. He also received an honorary Doctor of Laws degree in 2006 and received a certification of Mac-Nutrition in 2021.

With Gushue, Nichols is the co-owner and personal trainer with Orangethory Fitness in St. John's. In the summer of 2011, Nichols married his longtime girlfriend and fellow curler Colette Lemon. They have two children.  In August 2011, Nichols ran for the Progressive Conservative nomination in the district of Labrador West, losing to Nick McGrath. His mother, Helen competed for Newfoundland at the 1992 Scott Tournament of Hearts.

Teams

Awards
World Junior Curling Championships: All-Star Third - 2001
Brier: First Team All-Star, Lead - 2013
Brier: First Team All-Star, Second - 2014
Brier: First Team All-Star, Third - 2018
Brier: Second Team All-Star, Third - 2004, 2016, 2017 and 2022
World Men's Curling Championship: All-Star Third - 2017 and 2018

Notes

References

External links

 

1980 births
Living people
Brier champions
Businesspeople from St. John's, Newfoundland and Labrador
Canada Cup (curling) participants
Canadian male curlers
Canadian mixed curling champions
Continental Cup of Curling participants
Curlers from Newfoundland and Labrador
Curlers at the 2006 Winter Olympics
Curlers at the 2022 Winter Olympics
Medalists at the 2006 Winter Olympics
Medalists at the 2022 Winter Olympics
Memorial University of Newfoundland alumni
Olympic bronze medalists for Canada
Olympic curlers of Canada
Olympic gold medalists for Canada
Olympic medalists in curling
Pan Continental curling champions
People from Labrador City
Members of the Order of Newfoundland and Labrador
Sportspeople from St. John's, Newfoundland and Labrador
World curling champions